Wafaei or Wefayî, (1844–1902), was a Kurdish poet. His real name was Abdorrahim. He was born in Mahabad in present-day north-western Iran. He finished religious studies in Mahabad and became a cleric, and a teacher in the local school. He moved to Sulaimaniya in 1900 and stayed there for a while. He travelled to Mecca three times, the last one in 1902. He was accompanied by the Kurdish poet Piramerd. During his last pilgrimage, he became ill and died in the region between Iraq and Syria.

Works
He followed the classical rules of poetry in terms of rhyme and rhythm. He wrote most of his poems in the forms of Ghazal and Qasidah. The content of his poems are about Love and Nature. In some of his poems, he also mentions sufism. He was instrumental in introducing the Sulaimaniya sorani school of poetry (in particular Nalî's poetry) to the Kurds of Mukriyan region and western Iran. Wafayi was a disciple of Sheikh Ubeydullah and has written multiple poems for him.

References 

People from Mahabad
Kurdish-language poets
1844 births
1902 deaths
Kurdish scholars
19th-century poets